Horst Kadner (29 September 1930 – 23 July 2021) was a German sports shooter. He competed in the 50 metre pistol event at the 1960 Summer Olympics. Kadner died in Frankfurt on 23 July 2021, at the age of 90.

References

External links
 

1930 births
2021 deaths
German male sport shooters
Olympic shooters of the United Team of Germany
Shooters at the 1960 Summer Olympics
People from Meissen (district)
Sportspeople from Saxony